Paul Andrew Wilderdyke (born June 18, 1942) was a member of the Iowa House of Representatives from 2001 to 2007.  He was born in Missouri and raised in Grinnell, Iowa.  He served in the United States Navy for 20 years.  A Republican he was defeated in the 2006 primary.

References

External links
https://web.archive.org/web/20061006103733/http://www3.legis.state.ia.us/ga/member.do?id=82&ga=81
http://votesmart.org/candidate/biography/32585/paul-wilderdyke#.VCG_nBZvDWA

Living people
Republican Party members of the Iowa House of Representatives
1942 births